Kay Beevers Cobb (born February 28, 1942) is a former Justice of the Supreme Court of Mississippi.

Raised on a farm in Cleveland, Mississippi, Cobb was graduated from Cleveland High School before graduating from Mississippi University for Women in 1963. As her husband was in the U.S. Air Force, she then taught elementary school to children of military personnel for three years. She later worked for the Texas Employment Commission for five years as a job placement counselor for the handicapped and for people recently released from prison.

In 1975, Cobb enrolled in the University of Mississippi School of Law in Oxford, Mississippi, where she earned a law degree in 1978.

Cobb represented Mississippi's 9th senatorial district in the Mississippi Senate from January 1992 to January 1996. On April 1, 1999, Cobb was appointed to the Supreme Court of Mississippi by Governor Kirk Fordice, to complete the unexpired term of former Justice Charles L. Roberts Jr. Cobb was elected to a full term on the court in November 2000, and served until her retirement on May 1, 2007.

References

Justices of the Mississippi Supreme Court
1942 births
University of Mississippi School of Law alumni
Living people
Mississippi University for Women alumni
People from Cleveland, Mississippi
Mississippi state senators
20th-century American women judges
20th-century American judges
21st-century American women judges
21st-century American judges